The Estonian People's Party (ER) was a centre-right political party in Estonia.

History
The party was established in March 1919 by a merger of the Estonian Democratic Party and the Estonian Radical Democratic Party. Some right-wing members of the Democratic Party opposed merging with the Radical Democrats and broke away to form the Christian Democratic Party. In the April 1919 Constituent Assembly elections the new party won 25 of the 120 seats, becoming the third-largest party in the Assembly.

However, the 1920 election saw it reduced to 10 seats in the 100-seat Riigikogu. It won eight seats in the 1923 and 1926 elections, and nine in the 1929 elections.

In October 1931 it merged with Christian People's Party to form the United Nationalist Party, which was joined by the Estonian Labour Party in January 1932, becoming the National Centre Party.

References

Political parties established in 1919
Political parties disestablished in 1931
Defunct political parties in Estonia
1919 establishments in Estonia
1931 disestablishments in Estonia